Seasongood is a surname. Notable people with the surname include:

Jacob Seasongood ( 1812–1884), American merchant and banker
Murray Seasongood (1878–1983), American lawyer and politician